Jason James may refer to:

 Jason James (musician) (born 1981), Welsh musician
 Jason James (basketball), American college basketball coach
 Jason James (EastEnders), fictional character in EastEnders, played by Joseph Millson

See also
 
 Jay James (disambiguation)